Mindanao frog may refer to:

 Eastern Mindanao frog (Limnonectes diuatus), a frog in the family Dicroglossidae endemic to the Philippines
 Mindanao fanged frog (Limnonectes magnus), a frog in the family Dicroglossidae endemic to the Philippines
 Mindanao horned frog (Megophrys stejnegeri) a frog in the family Megophryidae endemic to the island of Mindanao in the Philippines

Animal common name disambiguation pages